NGC 2300 is a lenticular galaxy in the constellation Cepheus. It was discovered in 1871 by French astronomer Alphonse Borrelly using an 18 cm telescope.

See also 
 List of NGC objects (2001–3000)

References

External links 
 
 
 SEDS

Cepheus (constellation)
Discoveries by Alphonse Borrelly
Lenticular galaxies
Astronomical objects discovered in 1871
2300
021231